Białka  is a village in the administrative district of Gmina Dębowa Kłoda, within Parczew County, Lublin Voivodeship, in eastern Poland.

The village has a population of 280.

In December 1942 in the Białka massacre close to a hundred villagers were executed for helping the local partisans.

References

Villages in Parczew County
Kholm Governorate